is a series of landscape prints by the Japanese ukiyo-e artist Hokusai (1760–1849). The series depicts Mount Fuji from different locations and in various seasons and weather conditions. The immediate success of the publication led to another ten prints being added to the series.

Among the prints are three of Hokusai's most famous: The Great Wave off Kanagawa, Fine Wind, Clear Morning, and Thunderstorm Beneath the Summit. The lesser-known Kajikazawa in Kai Province is also considered one of the series' best works. The Thirty-six Views has been described as the artist's "indisputable colour-print masterpiece".

History  
Mount Fuji is a popular subject for Japanese art due to its cultural and religious significance. This belief can be traced to The Tale of the Bamboo Cutter, where a goddess deposits the elixir of life on the peak. As the historian Henry Smith explains, "Thus from an early time, Mt. Fuji was seen as the source of the secret of immortality, a tradition that was at the heart of Hokusai's own obsession with the mountain."

Each image was made through a process whereby Hokusai's drawing on paper was glued to a woodblock to guide the carving. The original design is therefore lost in the process. The block was then covered with ink and applied to paper to create the image (see Woodblock printing in Japan for further details). The complexity of Hokusai's images includes the wide range of colors he used, which required the use of a separate block for each color appearing in the image.

The earliest prints in the series were made with largely blue tones (aizuri-e), including the key blocks which provide an image's outlines. Prussian blue pigment had not long been introduced to Japan from Europe and Hokusai used it extensively, ensuring its popularity. Once the publisher, Nishimura, was sure of the series' success, prints were made with multiple colours (nishiki-e). Nishimura had planned to expand the series to more than a hundred prints, but publication stopped at forty-six.

The most famous single image from the series is widely known in English as The Great Wave off Kanagawa. It is Hokusai's most celebrated work and is often considered the most recognizable work of Japanese art in the world. Another iconic work from Thirty-six Views is Fine Wind, Clear Morning, also known as Red Fuji, which has been described as "one of the simplest and at the same time one of the most outstanding of all Japanese prints".

Influence

While Hokusai's Thirty-six Views of Mount Fuji is the most famous ukiyo-e series to focus on Mount Fuji, there are several other works with the same subject, including Hiroshige's later series Thirty-six Views of Mount Fuji and Hokusai's subsequent book One Hundred Views of Mount Fuji (published 1834-1835).

In his 1896 book on Hokusai, French art critic Edmond de Goncourt wrote that despite its "rather crude colors", it was, "the album which inspires the landscapes of the impressionists of the present moment." The French artist Henri Rivière (1864–1951) published the set of color lithographs "Thirty-six views of the Tour Eiffel" in 1902, inspired by the seminal print set of Hokusai, one of the many influences of Japanese art on late 19th century and early 20th century French art (Japonism, known as "Japonisme" in French)

Prints

Original thirty-six

Additional 10

Exhibitions

A collection of Thirty-six Views of Mount Fuji prints contained in the wellness spa of the Costa Concordia was lost during the collision of the ship on January 13, 2012.

All forty-six prints (the original thirty-six plus the ten additions) were featured in the exhibition "Hokusai: 36 Views of Mount Fuji" at the Freer Gallery of Art and the Arthur M. Sackler Gallery, the Smithsonian's museums of Asian art, in the spring of 2012.

The Thirty-six Views of Mount Fuji prints were displayed at the Museum of Fine Arts, Boston as part of a Hokusai exhibit April 5 through August 9, 2015.

The Thirty-six Views of Mount Fuji prints were displayed at the National Gallery of Victoria, Melbourne, Australia as part of a Hokusai exhibit 21 July through 22 October 2017, featuring two copies of The Great Wave off Kanagawa, one from the NGV and one from Japan Ukiyo-e Museum.

See also
One Hundred Views of Mount Fuji
Three Views of Japan
Thirty-six Views of Mount Fuji by Hiroshige

Notes

References
 Nagata, Seiji (1999). Hokusai: Genius of the Japanese Ukiyo-e. Kodansha, Tokyo.
 Smith, Henry D. II (1988). Hokusai: One Hundred Views of Mt. Fuji. George Braziller, Inc., Publishers, New York. .

External links

Hokusai's 36 Views of Mount Fuji
A short biography of Hokusai including a section on the 36 Views of Mt. Fuji series.

1832 works
Works by Hokusai
Ukiyo-e print series